Ronaldo Fernando Esquerdo Bôscoli, usually known as Ronaldo Bôscoli, or just Bôscoli  (October 28, 1928 in Rio de Janeiro – November 18, 1994) was a Brazilian composer, songwriter, record producer and journalist.

He was very active and significant in the creation and development of the Bossa nova style in Brazil.

References 

Brazilian songwriters
Brazilian composers
1928 births
1994 deaths
Musicians from Rio de Janeiro (city)
Bossa nova singers
Brazilian journalists
Brazilian record producers
20th-century Brazilian male singers
20th-century Brazilian singers
20th-century journalists